Cape Burr is a headland in the Australian state of South Australia on the east coast of Eyre Peninsula in the gazetted locality of  Port Neill about  east of the locality's town centre.  It is the southern extremity of Dutton Bay.
  
The cape is one of several geographical features named during the first land-based European exploration of the eastern coast of Eyre Peninsula in 1840 by George Gawler, the Governor of South Australia. It was named after Thomas Burr, the Deputy Surveyor General of South Australia, who was one of those in the party accompanying Gawler.

See also
Burr (disambiguation)
Lady Kinnaird

References

B
B
B